The 2016 Hanteng Autos World Open was a professional ranking snooker tournament that took place between 25 and 31 July 2016 at the Yushan No.1 Middle School in Yushan, China. It was the third ranking event of the 2016/2017 season.

Shaun Murphy was the defending champion, but he lost 2–5 to Joe Perry in the quarter-finals.

Ali Carter won the fourth ranking title of his career, defeating Perry 10–8 in the final.

Prize fund
The breakdown of prize money for this year is shown below:

 Winner: £90,000
 Runner-up: £40,000
 Semi-final: £21,000
 Quarter-final: £12,500
 Last 16: £8,000
 Last 32: £6,500
 Last 64: £4,000

 Highest break: £2,000
 Total: £520,000

The "rolling 147 prize" for a maximum break stood at £35,000.

Wildcard round
These matches were played in Yushan on 25 July 2016.

Main draw

Final

Qualifying
These matches were held between 31 May and 2 June 2016 at the Preston Guild Hall in Preston, England. All matches were best of 9 frames.

Century breaks

Qualifying stage centuries

 142  Barry Hawkins
 141  Jimmy Robertson
 136  Thepchaiya Un-Nooh
 136  Marco Fu
 135, 124  Li Hang
 134  Ben Woollaston
 133, 101  Kurt Maflin
 126  Hammad Miah
 125  Ali Carter
 122  Sam Baird
 118  Matthew Selt
 113  Mitchell Mann

 112  Tom Ford
 110  Ian Burns
 109  Daniel Womersley
 107  Ryan Day
 107  Ashley Hugill
 106  Sunny Akani
 103  Anthony McGill
 102  Alan McManus
 102  Yan Bingtao
 101  John Higgins
 100  Sydney Wilson

Televised stage centuries

 144, 116, 112  John Higgins
 141, 115, 109, 106  Anthony McGill
 140  Matthew Selt
 139, 111  Graeme Dott
 139  Liang Wenbo
 137, 106, 104, 102, 100  Neil Robertson
 135, 101  Mark Williams
 135, 100  Ben Woollaston
 135  Zhang Anda
 133  Stephen Maguire
 132, 131, 120, 107, 106, 102  Joe Perry
 130, 127, 101  Ali Carter
 127, 125, 123, 107, 100  David Gilbert
 127  Fergal O'Brien 
 125, 125, 104  Thepchaiya Un-Nooh

 125, 120  Michael White
 124  Xiao Guodong
 122, 109  Matthew Stevens
 117  Ding Junhui
 115, 101  Ryan Day
 115  Kurt Maflin
 112  Sam Craigie
 111  Daniel Wells
 106  Shaun Murphy
 105  Kyren Wilson
 103  Ricky Walden
 102  Mark Selby
 101  Jamie Cope
 100  Alan McManus

References

2016
World Open
World Open (snooker)
Snooker competitions in China
World Open